Hideo Murai (村井 秀夫 Murai Hideo, December 5, 1958 – April 23, 1995) was a member of the Aum Shinrikyo cult and one of the perpetrators responsible for the Sakamoto family murder. He also helped plan the Tokyo subway sarin attack. Murai held a doctorate in astrophysics. He was reportedly the number three person in the Aum leadership, after Asahara and Hayakawa. He headed Aum Shinrikyo's Ministry of Science and Technology.

Death

Murai was mortally wounded when an ethnic Korean man named Hiroyuki Jo (徐裕行 Jo Hiroyuki), a member of the Yamaguchi-gumi (the largest organized crime Yakuza group in Japan), stabbed Murai repeatedly, in the presence of 10 police officers and about a hundred reporters recording the events and broadcasting them live.

His attacker did not attempt to flee and was peacefully arrested on the spot. Murai died in an ambulance.

References

1958 births
1995 deaths
Aum Shinrikyo
Japanese mass murderers
Japanese murderers of children
Japanese murder victims
People murdered by the Yakuza
Deaths by stabbing in Japan
Filmed assassinations